Kota Darul Naim is Kelantan's state secretariat building complex. It is located in Kota Bharu, Malaysia

Kota Bharu
State secretariat buildings in Malaysia
Buildings and structures in Kelantan
Kelantan State Legislative Assembly